Franz Schmidt (February 24, 1930 – 14 May, 2017 ) was an Austrian serial killer who was twice sentenced to life imprisonment, once for a child murder in 1957 and for a double murder in 1984. Accounting sentences for other convictions up to his release in 2013, he was one of the longest-serving convicts in the country's history.

Early life and crimes 
Franz Schmidt was born on February 24, 1930, in Weißenkirchen im Attergau. The first child of an unmarried maid who had had an affair with her employer, he was adopted at an early age and later sent to the Kaiserebersdorf Educational Institution, where he trained as a carpenter. After his release, he moved to Wels, married and had a child.

In 1957, Schmidt was sentenced to life imprisonment by the Innsbruck Regional Court killing a 14-year-old with a pitchfork handle, in addition to receiving a 8-year sentence for arson and attempted murder of another young woman. During his detainment, he confessed to attacking a 38-year-old woman in Pöham, and after a psychiatric reevaluation, the examining psychiatrist's report attested that he lacked any moral insight and exhibited sadistic tendencies. Nevertheless, on July 22, 1981, Schmidt was paroled for good behavior, and was given a 10-year probation period.

Double murder 
On June 14, 1984, Schmidt broke into a house in Redlham, where he mercilessly stabbed to death 39-year-old Gertrude Reiter and slashed the neck of her 3-year-old daughter, Barbara. Their bodies were found by the head of the family, Franz, who quickly notified the gendarmes. After a few months of gathering evidence and witness testimonies, the police arrested Schmidt on August 3.

While searching through the suspect's house, traces of blood whose blood type matched one of the victims was found on Schmidt's clothing. In addition, it was revealed that he had, among other things, sold two wristwatches he had stolen from the bodies following the murders. With this overwhelming evidence, Schmidt was charged with two counts of murder and aggravated theft, for which he was convicted and sentenced to another life term by the Wels District Court on December 5, 1985.

Suspected murder 
At the time, investigators also suspected that Schmidt might have been the killer of 13-year-old Andreas Pentz, who had been stabbed to death in Edt bei Lambach on September 12, 1982. Similarly to the Reiters, his watch had been stolen, and the crime scene was on a stretch between Schmidt's home address in Wels and family members in Frankenmarkt, whom he often visited on his moped. Despite this, no substantial evidence has ever linked him to the crime, and he has never admitted guilt in it either.

Release and aftermath 
After spending more than 53 years behind bars, the 83-year-old Franz Schmidt was released in early 2013 on the basis of positive reports from psychiatrists, as well as his old age and failing health. He was moved to a shared apartment in Wels, Austria, where he was constantly kept under supervision. He died there on 14 May, 2017 at the age of 87.

Files related to the Redlham murders are exhibited at the Crime and Gendermerie Museum at Scharnstein Castle.

See also 
 List of serial killers by country

External links 
 Supreme Court decision (1986) (in German)

References 

1930 births
2017 deaths
20th-century criminals
Austrian people convicted of murder
Austrian prisoners sentenced to life imprisonment
Austrian serial killers
Male serial killers
Murderers of children
People convicted of attempted murder
People convicted of murder by Austria
People from Upper Austria
Prisoners sentenced to life imprisonment by Austria
Violence against women in Austria